Trigonulina novemcostata is a carnivorous bivalve in the family Verticordiidae. It is native to the South China Sea with 7–8 prominent ribs on its surface and ranges from 2 - 200 millimeters in size. It is the only currently known species in the genus Trigonulina that lives outside of the Atlantic Ocean.

References 

Verticordiidae
Bivalves described in 1850
Taxa named by Arthur Adams (zoologist)
Taxa named by Lovell Augustus Reeve